Woodell is a surname. Notable people with the surname include:

 Barbara Woodell (1910–1997), American actress
 Pat Woodell (1944–2015), American actress and singer
 Stan Woodell (1928–2004), British botanist

See also
 Woodall (disambiguation)